Orthotrichum truncato-dentatum is a species of moss in the family Orthotrichaceae. It is native to Argentina and Uruguay. It was last collected over 100 years ago and its current status is unknown.

References

Orthotrichales
Endangered plants
Flora of Uruguay
Flora of Argentina
Taxonomy articles created by Polbot